The Smartest is the third commercial mixtape by American rapper Tee Grizzley. It was released on June 19, 2020, via 300 Entertainment. The mixtape features guest appearances from Big Sean, Lil Baby, Lil Keed, Meek Mill, Queen Naija and members of Detroit Youth Choir. Production was handled by several record producers, including Hit-Boy, Avedon, Helluva, Mustard, P-Lo and Scott Storch.

The mixtape peaked at number 22 on the Billboard 200. It was promoted by two singles: "Satish" and "Mr. Officer".

Track listing

Notes
  signifies a co-producer

Charts

References

External links

2020 mixtape albums
Tee Grizzley albums
Albums produced by Hit-Boy
Albums produced by DJ Mustard
Albums produced by Scott Storch